The SAP Football Club is an Antiguan football team playing in the Antigua and Barbuda Premier Division. It is based in Bolans. SAP stands for Spirit, Attitude & Performance.

History
SAP Football Club originated in 1979 in Bolans Village by a group of friends who were often considered outcast by the villagers.  As of such, the guys did everything together; ate, prayed, smoke, attended school, worked and played football together. 
A customary practice for the fellas was cooking and naming their dishes. These names range from, Yham Till You Drop, Bun Up Joe, Belly Full, Bun Bottom etc. However, they frequently cooked a meal called Sappy Rice.

So when the guys decided to form a football team in 1977 to play in the Bolans Community League they called their team Sappy, a derivation from the dish Sappy Rice.

In 1979 they joined ABFA League and renamed the team SAP and became the first club from the south side of Antigua to become a member of the Antigua & Barbuda Football Association.

By the beginning of the ’90s, the acronym for SAP became known as Success through Application and Practice. However, this was never made official and in 1999 was changed to Spirit, Attitude, Performance and still remains the same today.

SAP FC have clinched the Antiguan league title three times.  As champions of the 2008–2009 Antigua & Barbuda Premier Division, they have qualified for the 2010 CFU Club Championship.

Achievements
Antigua and Barbuda Premier Division: 3
1988-89, 2005–06, 2008–09

Antigua and Barbuda FA Cup: 2
2004-05, 2008–09

Antigua and Barbuda Charity Shield: 1
2004-05

Performance in CONCACAF competitions
CFU Club Championship: 2 appearances
Best: 2006–07 Group Phase – 6 pts

Current squad
As of December 12, 2006

Nationality given from place of birth

External links
 Official Website

Football clubs in Antigua and Barbuda
1979 establishments in Antigua and Barbuda